Phaea biplagiata is a species of beetle in the family Cerambycidae. It was described by Chemsak in 1977. It is known from Guatemala and Mexico.

References

biplagiata
Beetles described in 1977